Lucy Ward (born 15 April 1974) is known as a co-commentator for broadcasters such as BT Sport, BBC, Talksport, Channel 4 and Sky working on Women's and Men's football since 2007. She has worked on World Cups and Olympic Games throughout this time. Recently working for Prime Video and BT Sport on EPL games. Lucy was an English footballer who played as a forward. She spent most of her senior career with Leeds United and was also head of education and welfare at the boys' academy for the club from 1998 until 2015 until being sacked by the club; she subsequently won a sex discrimination and unfair dismissal case in 2016. She represented England at Under-21 level.

Club career
Ward joined Leeds United Ladies when it was a community team, staying with the club as they rose to be one of the best teams in England. She moved to Doncaster Rovers Belles in the 2002–03 season, returning to Leeds for the start of the following season.

She played in Lucas Radebe's testimonial at Elland Road in May 2005, scoring soon after coming on as a substitute for Gary Speed and later setting up a goal for Matthew Kilgallon.

In May 2006 she played in the Women's FA Cup Final, playing at centre-back due to injuries in the team; she scored an own goal after just three minutes as Leeds went on to lose 5–0 to Arsenal Ladies.

She became head of education and welfare at Leeds United's academy, overseeing around 250 junior players and a handful of young first-team players. She left the club in 2015, amidst winning a high-profile legal battle (in June 2016) against Leeds owner Massimo Cellino over her dismissal.

International career
Ward represented England at Under-21 level at just 16 years of age.

Other
Ward worked as a co-commentator for the BBC at the Women's World Cup in China, during the Euro 2009 qualifiers  and finals, and again during the London 2012 Olympic Games, and Euro 2013. Her partner is former Leeds United and Liverpool Ladies head coach Neil Redfearn.

Career statistics

References

Living people
English women's footballers
Leeds United Women F.C. players
Doncaster Rovers Belles L.F.C. players
FA Women's National League players
1974 births
English association football commentators
Leeds United F.C. non-playing staff
Women's association football forwards